Roland Wieser (born 6 May 1956, in Zschopau) is an East German racewalker who won the bronze medal in the 20 kilometer walk during the 1980 Summer Olympics with a time of 1:25:59 hours. During his active career he measured 1.86 meters in height and 68 kg in weight.

Wieser's first success came at an early age, when he became the East German 10 kilometer walk Youth Champion in 1971. In 1975 he became the European Junior Champion in the same event.  In 1978, Weiser competed in the East German National Championship and won the 50 kilometer walk; in the same year he achieved his first major success when he became the European Champion in the 20 kilometer walk at the elite level with a time of 1:23:11.5 hours.  He followed this two years later with his Olympic bronze medal.

After his Olympic triumph Wieser did not win any additional medals in international competition. In 1982 he finished ninth in the European Championships, in 1983 he managed tenth in the World Championships, and in 1987 he retired from competitive walking.

After his retirement Wieser studied to become an auto mechanic, and later became a sports instructor at the Volkspolizei-Präsidium in Berlin.  During these years he ran at the club level for SC Dynamo Berlin and trained under Max Weber.

Achievements

References

1956 births
Living people
East German male racewalkers
Athletes (track and field) at the 1980 Summer Olympics
Olympic bronze medalists for East Germany
Olympic athletes of East Germany
World record setters in athletics (track and field)
People from Zschopau
European Athletics Championships medalists
Olympic bronze medalists in athletics (track and field)
Medalists at the 1980 Summer Olympics
Sportspeople from Saxony